Tom Nowlan is an Australian rugby union player who plays for the  in Super Rugby. His playing position is lock. He was named in the Rebels squad for Round 3 of the 2021 Super Rugby AU season. He previously represented  in the 2019 National Rugby Championship.

Super Rugby statistics

Reference list

External links
Rugby.com.au profile
itsrugby.co.uk profile

Australian rugby union players
Living people
Rugby union locks
Year of birth missing (living people)
Melbourne Rebels players
Rugby union flankers
New South Wales Country Eagles players
Shimizu Koto Blue Sharks players
Australian expatriate rugby union players
Expatriate rugby union players in Japan